The Neolog Synagogue ( or) in Cluj-Napoca, Romania, is the city's only working synagogue, Jewish community. It was originally built for the local Neolog congregation.  

Located on Horea Street, it was built based on the plans of Izidor Hegner, an engineer, between 1886 and 1887. Seriously affected after attacks by the Iron Guard on September 13, 1927, it was soon rebuilt by the Romanian government. 

In the period following the Second Vienna Award, when Northern Transylvania was taken by Hungary, it witnessed the Jews' deportation to Nazi extermination camps, Auschwitz-Birkenau, and was damaged by the bombardments of the neighbouring railway station, on June 2, 1944. In 1951 it was again restored.

It is currently dedicated to the memory of those deported who were victims of The Holocaust.

External links
 Photos

 www.jewishcluj.eu

Buildings and structures in Cluj-Napoca
History of Cluj-Napoca
Synagogues in Romania
Neolog Judaism synagogues
Synagogues completed in 1887